Labeobarbus fasolt is a species of ray-finned fish in the genus Labeobarbus which is found only in rivers in the Democratic Republic of the Congo.

References 

 

fasolt
Fish described in 1914
Endemic fauna of the Democratic Republic of the Congo